Armenia debuted in the Eurovision Song Contest 2006 with the song "Without Your Love" written by Armen Matirosyan and Catherine Bekian. The song was performed by André, who was selected internally by the Armenian broadcaster Public Television of Armenia (AMPTV) to represent Armenia in the 2006 contest in Athens, Greece. André's selection as the Armenian artist was announced on 20 January 2006, while the song "Without Your Love" was later presented to the public on 17 March 2006.

Armenia competed in the semi-final of the Eurovision Song Contest which took place on 18 May 2006. Performing as the opening entry for the show in position 1, "Without Your Love" was announced among the top 10 entries of the semi-final and therefore qualified to compete in the final on 20 May. It was later revealed that Armenia placed sixth out of the 23 participating countries in the semi-final with 150 points. In the final, Armenia was the closing performance of the show in position 24, placing eighth out of the 24 participating countries with 129 points.

Background 

The Armenian national broadcaster, Public Television of Armenia (AMPTV), confirmed their intentions to debut at the 2006 Eurovision Song Contest. Despite initially announcing that a national final would be organized to select for the 2006 Armenian entry, AMPTV, which broadcasts the event within Armenia and organises the selection process for the nation's entry, later opted to internally selected both the artist and the song instead.

Before Eurovision

Internal selection 
The Armenian entry for the Eurovision Song Contest 2006 was internally selected by the AMPTV. On 7 January 2006, AMPTV announced a public call for song submissions with a deadline of 20 January 2006. On 20 January, André was announced as the Armenian representative. In regards to his selection as the Armenian entrant, André stated: "I was so excited at first when I learned the news of my participation. Then I realized what a tremendous responsibility it is, after all I am going to represent not my personality but the country, and that is very serious." AMPTV later announced in February 2006 that the Armenian entry had been selected from 20 songs submitted by songwriters worldwide.

The song "Without Your Love", composed by Armen Matirosyan with lyrics by Catherine Bekian, was announced as the Armenian entry on 8 February 2006. André filmed the official video for the song prior to the presentation, which was directed by Hrach Keshishyan. The song and video were presented to the public on 17 March 2006.

At Eurovision
All countries except the "Big 4" (France, Germany, Spain and the United Kingdom), the host country, and the ten highest placed finishers in the 2005 contest, are required to qualify from the semi-final in order to compete for the final; the top ten countries from the semi-final progress to the final. On 21 March 2006, a special allocation draw was held which determined the running order for the semi-final and Armenia was set to open the show and perform in position 1, before the entry from Bulgaria. At the end of the show, Armenia was announced as having finished in the top 10 and subsequently qualifying for the grand final. It was later revealed that Armenia placed sixth in the semi-final, receiving a total of 150 points. During the winners' press conference for the ten qualifying countries after the semi-final, Armenia was drawn to perform last in position 24, following the entry from Turkey. Armenia placed eighth in the final, scoring 129 points.

In Armenia, both the semi-final and the final were broadcast on Channel 1 with commentary by  Gohar Gasparyan and Felix Khachatryan. The Armenian spokesperson, who announced the Armenian votes during the final, was Gohar Gasparyan.

Voting 
Below is a breakdown of points awarded to Armenia and awarded by Armenia in the semi-final and grand final of the contest. The nation awarded its 12 points to Russia in the semi-final and the final of the contest.

Points awarded to Armenia

Points awarded by Armenia

References 

2006
Countries in the Eurovision Song Contest 2006
Eurovision